The Peyton Company, also called Peyton Marine Service and Supplies, was a wooden shipbuilding and dry dock company in Newport Beach, California. 

The shipyard was started by J. W. Peyton (1875-?), born in Texas, and his wife Anabel Peyton (1886-?). The shipyard was later owned by his sons, C. R. Peyton (1911-?) and R. P. Peyton (1919-?), a naval architect. The Peyton Company purchased the shipyard from the Balboa Marina Hardware Company, owned by Westin T. Jay. 

The Peyton Company built civilian boats, yachts and fishing boats, in Newport Harbor. To support the World War II demand for ships, the Peyton Company shipyard switched over to military construction and built Army harbor tugboats and Navy sub chasers. The Peyton Company leased Newport Harbor waterfront land to build these ships. After the war, in 1945 the shipyard closed, partly due to the two deaths in the family. The shipyard office was at 901 Pacific Coast Hwy, Newport Beach.

Notable ships 
US Navy submarine chaser that had a displacement of 148 tons, a length of 110 feet, a beam 17 feet, a draft of 6 feet top speed of 21 knots. A crew of 28. Armed with: one 40mm gun, two .50 cal. machine guns, two depth charge projector "K Gun," and two depth charge tracks. Powered with two 1,540bhp General Motors (Electro-Motive Div.) 16-184A diesel engines to two shafts. 

 US Army TP harbor tug with displacement 185 tons gross, a length of 97 feet, a beam 25 feet, a draft of 11  feet, Power one Fairbanks–Morse six cylinder diesel engine to a single propeller with 450 shp. The TP is for "Tug/Passenger". The US Army had 43 of this 96-foot tugs built for World War II, Peyton Company built 4 of them.

See also
California during World War II
Maritime history of California
Ackerman Boat Company
South Coast Shipyard
Victory Shipbuilding
Wooden boats of World War 2

References

American Theater of World War II
1940s in California
American boat builders